is a volleyball video game developed by Pax Softnica and published by Nintendo. It was released for the Family Computer Disk System in Japan in 1986, and for the Nintendo Entertainment System in North America and Europe in 1987. It was originally released in 1986, and was re-released for the Wii Virtual Console in Europe on August 10, 2007, and in North America on August 21, 2007.

Gameplay 
Volleyball is a sports video game that follows the rules of volleyball. The player controls a team of six players, three at the net and three in back. The player serves the ball into play by pressing the same button twice.

The game is a six player-a-side volleyball simulation. Players can select teams to compete in either a men's or women's competition from the following countries: United States, Japan, China, Korea, Brazil, Soviet Union, Cuba, and Tunisia.

Development 
Volleyball is based on an arcade game. Volleyball was developed by Pax Soft Nica and Nintendo R&D1 and published by Nintendo. It was released in March 1987.

Reception 
Christopher Michael Baker of AllGame rated the game two out of five and said that it showed the developer's inexperience at creating volleyball games. He could not figure out which character he controlled at any given point nor the ball's location as poorly anticipated by its shadow. He criticized the "annoying" sound effects. He said that Nintendo had made games for all other sports and likely was obliged to make a volleyball game. He ultimately recommended Kings of the Beach and Super Spike V'Ball instead.

Lucas M. Thomas of IGN said that Volleyball could be Nintendo's worst sports game, worse than even NES Soccer. He said the controls were automatically frustrating.

Notes

References

1986 video games
Nintendo Entertainment System games
Nintendo Research & Development 1 games
Pax Softnica games
PlayChoice-10 games
Video games developed in Japan
Video games scored by Koji Kondo
Virtual Console games
Virtual Console games for Wii U
Volleyball video games
Multiplayer and single-player video games
Nintendo arcade games
Nintendo games
Nintendo Switch Online games